Wyględów [vɨglɛnduf] is a neighbourhood in the north-western part of the district of Mokotów in Warsaw, Poland.

The name of the area comes from the village of Wyględów-Kościesze, which was founded in the 15th century and was placed near what is now the Bełska street.

The intensive development of this area  began with the construction of a fort by the Russian authorities in the second half of the 19th century. Fort Mokotów belonged to the inner ring of the forts of Warsaw. 

A new stage in the development of the Fort Mokotowski area, as well as other Warsaw suburbs, came in the years 1916-1917 with new proposals on joining suburban districts to the city and establishing its new borders.

Notable places 
 Fort M („Mokotów”) 
 Central Clinical Hospital MSWiA
 National Institute of Geriatrics, Rheumatology and Rehabilitation
 Mokotów Field
 Soviet Military Cemetery

References

External links
 

Neighbourhoods of Mokotów